A career center, also called a vocational school, is a type of educational institution.

Career center or Career Center may also refer to:

 Career Center (Williamston, South Carolina)
 Career Center (Winston-Salem, North Carolina)

See also
 
 Career Enrichment Center
 Career Preparation Center